The 2008 ISSF World Cup Final in shotgun events was held on 27–30 September in Minsk, Belarus. It was the last major worldwide shotgun competition in 2008, and the next-to-last part of the 2008 ISSF World Cup, to be concluded with the rifle and pistol finals in Bangkok a month later.

There were twelve spots in each of the five events. The defending champion from the 2007 World Cup Final and all medalists of the 2008 Olympics in Beijing qualified automatically for Minsk. The remaining eight qualified through a special point-awarding system based on their best performance during the World Cup season, skipping past automatic qualifiers. Not counting the defending champion and the Olympic medalists, there was a maximum of two shooters per event from the same country. Belarus, being the host country, also were allowed to participate with one shooter.

The qualification system awarded a win with 15 points, a silver medal with 10, a bronze medal with 8, a fourth place with 5, a fifth with 4, a sixth with 3, a seventh with 2 and an eighth place with 1 point. It also gave out points for qualification scores within a certain range from the current world record: from 1 point for fourteen hits off the record, to 15 points for equalling or raising it.

Schedule and winners 
All times are local (UTC+3).

Men's trap

Qualification

Results

DNF Did not finish

Men's double trap

Qualification 

Faulds and Alshamsy did not participate and were replaced by Daniele Di Spigno and Mikhail Leybo.

Results

Men's skeet

Qualification 

Flores did not participate and was replaced by Frank Thompson. In addition, Andrei Gerachtchenko entered as the host country's wild card.

Results

Women's trap

Qualification 

Pak did not participate and was replaced by Joetta Dement.

Results

Women's skeet

Qualification 

Avetisyan, Brinker and Bacosi did not participate and were replaced by Katiuscia Spada.

Results

DNS Did not start

External links 
 Qualification standings at the ISSF website

ISSF World Cup
World Cup Final